En Vivo: Gira Pata de Perro is a live album released by Mexican rock band Maldita Vecindad y los Hijos del Quinto Patio. Their third album was released on February 1, 1993 under the BMG label.

Track listing
 Solín - 6:10
 Pata de Perro - 4:15
 Un Gran Circo - 4:29
 Un Poco de Sangre - 5:23
 Pachuco - 6:05
 Mojado - 5:44

Personnel
 Roco - vocals
 Aldo - guitars
 Pato - bass
 Pacho - drums
 Sax - saxophones
 Lobito - percussion

References 

Maldita Vecindad albums
1993 live albums
Live Rock en Español albums